The DA-88 was a digital multitrack recording device introduced by the TASCAM division of the TEAC Corporation in 1993. This modular, digital multitrack device uses tape as the recording medium and could record up to eight tracks simultaneously. It also allowed multiple DA-88 devices to be combined to record 16 or more tracks. The first models in the series (the TASCAM DA-88, DA-38, DA-98 and Sony PCM-800) recorded at 16-bit resolution. TASCAM later introduced the DA-98HR and DA-78HR, which recorded at 24-bit resolution and sample rates up to 48 kHz (for DA-78HR) and 192 kHz (for DA-98HR, suitable for recording high-resolution audio). Audio data was stored in the DTRS (Digital Tape Recording System) format on Hi8 video cassettes, allowing up to 108 minutes of continuous recording on a single tape.

In 1995, the TASCAM DA-88 won the Emmy award for technical excellence. The affordability and digital format of the DA-88 led to sales of more than 60,000 units by 1999. At that time, it was the biggest product in the history of TASCAM.Because of its reliability and durability, the DA-88 and its subsequent fellow units continue to be used by aficionados.

See also
 TASCAM Digital Interface

References

External links 
 Tascam Official Site
 Tascam legacy (discontinued) products
 The Definitive Guide to The Tascam DA-88 and DTRS-Format Recorders
 Repairing DA-88, DA-98HR and PCM800 and similar DTRS machines which can damage tapes due to a lack of back tension

Recording
Digital audio recording
Audio storage